Zhang Yulong (born 10 November 2000) is a Chinese footballer currently playing as a defender for Wuhan Jiangcheng, on loan from Wuhan.

Career statistics

Club
.

References

2000 births
Living people
Chinese footballers
Association football defenders
Chinese Super League players
Hebei F.C. players
Wuhan F.C. players